The Sicilian Senior Open was a men's senior (over 50) professional golf tournament on the European Senior Tour. It was held just once, in October 2010, at the Il Picciolo Golf Club, Castiglione di Sicilia, on the north-east part of Sicily, Italy. The winner was Domingo Hospital who won the first prize of €37,500 out of total prize-money of €250,000, after a playoff with Horacio Carbonetti.

Winners

External links
Coverage on the European Senior Tour's official site

Former European Senior Tour events
Golf tournaments in Italy
Recurring sporting events established in 2010
Recurring sporting events disestablished in 2010
Defunct sports competitions in Italy